XHGU-FM (105.9 MHz) is a radio station serving the border towns of Ciudad Juárez, Chihuahua, Mexico (its city of license) and El Paso, Texas, United States (where it also maintains a sales office). It is owned by MegaRadio México and carries a pop format known as Switch FM.

XHGU-FM broadcasts in HD.

History
XHGU received its concession on October 17, 1980. It was owned by Guillermo O. Huerta Ramírez and broadcast with an ERP of 23 kW. In July 1982, XHGU was authorized to double its power to 46 kW.

On December 31, 2002, the SCT authorized XHGU to move its transmitter to Ojitos, on Cerro del Indio, with an effective radiated power of 100,000 watts.

In 2016, XHGU flipped from its previous Romance romantic format to Switch, MegaRadio's new pop format.

References

Radio stations in Chihuahua
Mass media in Ciudad Juárez